Nyctopais burgeoni is a species of beetle in the family Cerambycidae. It was described by Stephan von Breuning in 1934. It is known from the Democratic Republic of the Congo.

References

Tragocephalini
Beetles described in 1934
Endemic fauna of the Democratic Republic of the Congo